The Ministry of Health (abbreviated MOH) is a national government-run ministry administering health affairs and health care in Myanmar, including all of the medical schools. In 2016, President Htin Kyaw dissolved the Ministry of Sports (Myanmar) and organized it under the Ministry of Health.

On 25 May 2016, it was renamed to Ministry of Health and Sports (Myanmar).

On 1 August 2021, the SAC reconstituted the Ministry of Health and Sports as Ministry of Health and Ministry of Sports and Youth Affairs.

Departments
The Ministry of Health is divided into departments, each headed by a Director-General.
 Department of Public Health
 Department of Medical Services
 Department of Health Professional Resources Development and Management
 Department of Medical Research
 Department of Traditional Medicine
 Department of Food and Drug Administration
 Department of Sports and Physical Education

Department of Health Professional Resources Development and Management is controlling body of following universities in 2014.
 University of Medicine 1, Yangon
 University of Medicine 2, Yangon
 University of Medicine, Mandalay
 University of Medicine, Magway
 University of Medicine, Taunggyi
 University of Dental Medicine, Yangon
 University of Dental Medicine, Mandalay
 University of Public Health, Yangon
 University of Community Health, Magway
 University of Nursing, Yangon
 University of Nursing, Mandalay
 University of Medical Technology, Yangon
 University of Medical Technology, Mandalay
 University of Pharmacy, Yangon
 University of Pharmacy, Mandalay
 University of Traditional Medicine,Mandalay

List of heads

Pre–Independence
 Hla Min (1943–45)
 Ba Gyan (1945–47)

AFPFL Government
 Aung Zan Wai
 Khin Maung Lat
 Sein Ban, Dr
 Ba Saw
 Hla Min

Caretaker Government
 Tun Tin (1958–60)

Pyidaungsu Party Government
 Sultan Mahmud (1960–62)

Revolutionary Council Government
 Than Pe, Commodore (1962)
 Hla Han, Col. (1964–74)

Burma Socialist Programme Party Government
 Hla Han, Col. (1974)
 Kyi Maung (1974–78)
 Win Maung (1978–81)
 Tun Wai (1981–88)

State Law and Order Restoration Council Government
 Pe Thein, Col. (1988–93)
 Than Nyunt, Vice-Adm. (1993–96)
 Saw Tun (1996–97)

State Peace and Development Council Government
 Kat Sein, Maj-Gen. (November 1997–November 2003)
 Kyaw Myint, Dr. (November 2003–March 2011)

Thein Sein 's Government
 Pe Thet Khin, Dr. (March 2011 – July 2014)
 Than Aung, Dr. (August 2014 – 30 March 2016)

Htin Kyaw 's Government 
 Myint Htwe, Dr. (30 March 2016 - 2018)

Win Myint 's Government 
 Myint Htwe, Dr. (2018- 1 February 2021)

Min Aung Hlaing Military  's Government 
 Thet Khaing Win- Dr. (1 February 2021 – present)

See also
 Health in Myanmar
 HIV/AIDS in Myanmar
 Ministry of Sports (Myanmar)
 Ministry of Health and Sports (Myanmar)

References

Health
Medical and health organisations based in Myanmar
Myanmar
Ministries established in 1947
1974 establishments in Burma